Chrysoglossa norburyi is a moth of the family Notodontidae first described by James S. Miller in 2008. It is found in Costa Rica.

The length of the forewings is 17-18.5 mm for males and 18–21 mm for females. The ground color of the forewings is evenly slate gray-brown. The outer margin of the hindwings has a wide, dark slate-gray band extending from the apex to the tornus. The central area is shiny white, semitransparent and dusted with gray scales along the posterior margin. The anal margin is broadly light gray to slate gray and the anterior margin is light gray.

The larvae feed on Alfaroa guanacastensis. The caterpillars show coloring similar to larvae of Nebulosa species.

Etymology
The species is named for Maria Norbury, who gave inspirational support for rainforest conservation in Area de Conservacion Guanacaste, where this species lives.

References

Moths described in 2008
Notodontidae